Friesenried is a municipality in the district of Ostallgäu in Bavaria in Germany. Friesenried is twinned with the town of North Walsham in Norfolk.

References

Ostallgäu